The 1883–84 Irish Cup was the fourth edition of the premier knock-out cup competition in Irish football.

Distillery won the tournament for the first time, defeating Wellington Park 5–0 in the final. The holders Cliftonville were eliminated in the third round by Distillery.

Results

First round

|}

Second round

|}

Replays

|}

Third round

|}

Semi-finals

|}

Final

References

External links
 Northern Ireland Cup Finals. Rec.Sport.Soccer Statistics Foundation (RSSSF)

Irish Cup seasons
1883–84 domestic association football cups
1883–84 in Irish association football